The bleeding flower moth (Schinia sanguinea) is a moth of the family Noctuidae. It is found from North Carolina to Florida, west to Texas, north to Montana. There is also a disjunct population in Ontario.

Schinia carmosina was elevated from synonymy of Schinia sanguinea and is now a separate species.

The wingspan is 24–35 mm. Adults are on wing from September to October.

The larvae feed on Liatris species.

External links
Images
Bug Guide

Schinia
Moths of North America
Moths described in 1832